Estancia de Ánimas is located in the municipality of Villa González Ortega in the Mexican state of Zacatecas.
It is located in Municipio Villa Gonzalez Ortega, Zacatecas

References

Populated places in Zacatecas